In Greek mythology, Arrhon (Ancient Greek: Ἄρρωνος) may refer to the two different figures:

 Arrhon, a Minyan prince as the son of King Clymenus (Periclymenus) of Orchomenus and Buzyge (or Budeia) and his brothers were Erginus, Azeus, Pyleus, Stratius, Eurydice and Axia. Together with his brothers, they attacked Thebes and, being victorious, imposed on the city a tribute to be paid each year for the murder of their father Clymenus.
 Arrhon, an Arcadian king as the son of Erymanthus, a descendant of King Lycaon of Arcadia. He was the father of Psophis, one of the possible eponyms for the city of Psophis.

Notes

References 

 Homer, The Odyssey with an English Translation by A.T. Murray, PH.D. in two volumes. Cambridge, MA., Harvard University Press; London, William Heinemann, Ltd. 1919. . Online version at the Perseus Digital Library. Greek text available from the same website.
Pausanias, Description of Greece with an English Translation by W.H.S. Jones, Litt.D., and H.A. Ormerod, M.A., in 4 Volumes. Cambridge, MA, Harvard University Press; London, William Heinemann Ltd. 1918. . Online version at the Perseus Digital Library
 Pausanias, Graeciae Descriptio. 3 vols. Leipzig, Teubner. 1903. Greek text available at the Perseus Digital Library.
Stephanus of Byzantium, Stephani Byzantii Ethnicorum quae supersunt, edited by August Meineike (1790-1870), published 1849. A few entries from this important ancient handbook of place names have been translated by Brady Kiesling. Online version at the Topos Text Project.

Princes in Greek mythology
Kings in Greek mythology
Minyan characters in Greek mythology
Arcadian mythology